School District 36 Surrey operates schools in Surrey, White Rock, and Barnston Island, British Columbia. It is the largest school district in British Columbia with 71,838 students during the 2016/2017 school year. District 36 includes 101 elementary schools, 26 secondary schools, and 5 learning centres. The first school in Surrey opened in 1882. The district is Surrey’s largest employer with 10,989 employees including 6,063 teachers.

Administration
The Surrey School District's administration hub is the District Education Centre and was officially opened on September 11, 2011.

Schools

Elementary schools

Secondary schools and other programs

Budget
The Surrey School District balanced its budget for the 2013-14 school year. A $600 million preliminary operating budget was approved for the 2013-2014 school year. It comprises $573 million in provincial government grants and $15 million from district revenue. An additional $12.3 million was found in unspent funds and another $4 million was to come through reducing expenditures and some job reductions. There was an overall decrease of 45 positions, including 25 teachers and 17 support staff, mainly through attrition. The Surrey School District is one of few districts in the province experiencing an increase in enrolment.

The district has 273 portables to address overcapacity. In May 2016, the provincial government announced contributing $100 million to fund six projects to add 2,700 new student spaces by the end of 2020. September 2019 The District Now Has 361 Portable Classrooms.

In the news
The Surrey School District was reported in the national news numerous times during the 1990s and 2000s, most notably for its stand on social issues.

Overcrowding

The Surrey School District has 361 portable classrooms for the 2019/2020 school year, 28 more than for the previous year. The district projects about 1100 students per year. Approximately 9000 students are in portables as of 2019/20.

Book banning
The District School Board was the focus of major media attention from 1997 to 2002 over its stand on not allowing books about families with same-sex parents  to be included as optional learning resources. These books were requested by James Chamberlain, a kindergarten teacher, to reflect on the realities of today's families and to teach his pupils about diversity and tolerance.

A legal battle to overturn the decision to ban the three books went all the way to the Supreme Court of Canada, where the school board's decision was overturned. The judgment, Chamberlain v. Surrey School District No. 36, cited the need for families headed by same-sex couples to be respected. Chief Justice Beverley McLachlin dismissed the Board's concerns that children would be confused or misled by classroom information about same-sex parents. She pointed out that the children of same-sex parents are rubbing shoulders with children from more traditional families, and wrote: "Tolerance is always age-appropriate, children cannot learn unless they are exposed to views that differ from those they are taught at home." The legal fees ended up costing Surrey taxpayers over $1,200,000.

Drama production
In 2005, the Surrey School District made national news for cancelling production of The Laramie Project, a play that deals with the murder of a gay university student, in Elgin Park Secondary.  Advocates for the play noted that it is designed to teach tolerance toward LGBT people. The school district's administration said that the play contains sex, violence and foul language and is not appropriate as family entertainment.  The decision met with outrage from LGBT advocacy organization Egale Canada.  A school in neighbouring Vancouver, Lord Byng Secondary School, subsequently chose to stage the play.

Climate change
In May 2007, the Surrey School Board made national news when it voted to instruct teachers not to show Al Gore's Academy Award-winning documentary on climate change, An Inconvenient Truth, until trustees were able to review the film.  On the issue of climate change, Board Trustee and social activist Heather Stilwell stated: "I am not sure. I mean I see evidence. I think there is climate change, there's no question about that. Whether what Al Gore says about it is the truth, I have questions."

Bible study
In early November 2009, a Cloverdale father, Paul Jubenvill, requested an extra-curricular, non-instructional, voluntarily-attended Bible club be established during lunch-hour at his sons' school, Colebrook Elementary. The school would not permit the club on their property, and the Surrey School District supported the school's position. The father argued that this ban violated the provincial BC Human Rights Code by disallowing a normally available service on the grounds of discrimination against religion. The school district was concerned that permitting the club may have given the appearance of the school endorsing a particular religious ideology. Jubenvill argued that there is a difference between endorsing a faith versus "accommodating" spiritual needs.

A complaint was filed with the BC Human Rights Tribunal; however, Jubenvill withdrew the complaint because he felt that the resulting media attention and the reaction it generated did not accurately represent his intentions and he preferred to address the matter with the school district out of the public eye.

Some secondary schools in the School District have, or have had, overtly Christian clubs (for example, LA Matheson has a prayer club titled "PUSH",  Semiahmoo Secondary had a Crossroad Christian club in 2008 and earlier years, and Fraser Heights Secondary had a Bible Club in 2007).

Roof collapse
At Colebrook Elementary in July 2010, a 75-foot portion of a roof over an exterior walkway collapsed, with no injuries reported.  In 2011 the school district initiated legal action against the contractor and architect involved in the design and construction of the roof, which had been built in 1987.

Anti-discrimination code
In November 2013 the School Board adopted an anti-discrimination code to provide protection for students and staff against homophobic and other forms of bullying.  Approximately one third of all school districts in the province have policies against homophobic bullying.

Gallery

See also
 List of school districts in British Columbia

References

External links
 
 BC Ministry of Education - school information webpage 
 SCC decision--Chamberlain v. Surrey School District No. 36
 Supreme Court says B.C. school board wrong to ban same-sex books
 Affidavit used in Chamberlain case
 Book banning in Surrey, What happened?

36
Education in Surrey, British Columbia
Educational institutions in Canada with year of establishment missing